Étoile du Roy ('King's Star'), formerly Grand Turk, is a three-masted sixth-rate frigate, designed to represent a generic warship during the Age of Sail, with her design greatly inspired by HMS Blandford. The ship was built in Marmaris, Turkey, in 1996 to provide a replica of a frigate for the production of the ITV series adapted from the novels about Royal Navy officer Horatio Hornblower by C. S. Forester. Nowadays the tall ship is used mainly in sailing events, for corporate or private charter, and for receptions in her spacious saloon or on her deck. In 2010 the French company Étoile Marine Croisières, based at Saint-Malo, Brittany, purchased the ship and renamed her Étoile du Roy.

Construction and design
The model for the replica was a frigate designed by Michael Turk of Turks Shipyard Ltd. of Chatham, which was established in 1710. The modern replica was constructed of iroko planking over laminated mahogany frames.

The ship was originally fitted with six 9-pounder replica cannon constructed by the naval dockyard of Sevastopol, Ukraine. These guns consisted of a high tensile steel tube encased in moulded alloy to resemble the original weapons, and were designed only to fire  black powder charges. On 24 August 2001 a crew member was injured after a premature explosion during the firing of a gun, while the ship was taking part in the International Festival of the Sea at Portsmouth. The Marine Accident Investigation Branch were obliged to consult the Keeper of Artillery from the Royal Armouries museum for technical assistance and advice.

Appearances

She also served in the same TV series as the French ship Papillon. In 2000, she undertook a voyage around Britain for the National Trust, calling at eight ports, where she was open to the public with the National Trust 'Coast Show' on board.

Film and TV credits
 Hornblower, 1998–2003.
 Longitude, 2000.
 Monsieur N., 2003.
 To the Ends of the Earth, 2005.
 Crusoe, 2008.
 Michiel de Ruyter, 2015.
 La Fortuna, 2021.
 Napoleon, 2023

Current location
The frigate was purchased by Bob Escoffier of the Étoile Marine Croisières, which already operates a number of traditional sailing ships: Étoile de France, Étoile Molène, Étoile Polaire, Naire Maove''' and the schooner-aviso Recouvrance in Brest (in partnership with its owner, the SOPAB). The final sale price was not disclosed.

After being moored in Whitby for over a decade, Grand Turk sailed for her current location in France on 16 March 2010.

See also
  – Replica of HMS Rose'' (1757), built in 1970.
 Ship replica (including a list of ship replicas)

References

External links 

BBC video (42 min.) – re-enactment of the Battle of Trafalgar with the Grand Turk as the HMS ''V.htm Crew photos of "Trafalgar 200"
Crew photos of "Monsieur N" filming in St Malo (France) 2002
Crew photos of "To the ends of the Earth" filming off Dunkirk (France) 2004

1996 ships
Tall ships of the United Kingdom
Tall ships of France
Replica ships
Sixth-rate frigates of the Royal Navy